The Kimber Micro 9 is a lightweight, single-action pocket pistol chambered for the 9×19mm Parabellum cartridge, produced by Kimber Manufacturing. This firearm model was first announced in 2015.

Brief history
In 2016, Kimber introduced the Kimber Micro 9. This included removeable grips and mainspring housing, rounded trigger guard, drift-able fixed sights, solid aluminum trigger, full length metal guide rod.

Specifications
Chambering: 9mm
Weight: 15.6 ounces 
Trigger Pull: 7.0 pounds
Barrel Length: 3.15 inches  
Overall Height: 4.1 inches 
Overall Length: 6.1 inches 
Grip Width: 1.06 inches 
Magazine Capacity: 6+1, 7+1, 8+1
Sights: Black, fixed drift-able. 
Accessory Rail: no

See also
Colt Mustang
Colt Mustang XSP
Kimber Micro
SIG Sauer P238
SIG Sauer P938
Springfield Armory 911

References

External links
American Rifleman test
TFB Review
Shooting Times

Kimber firearms
9mm Parabellum semi-automatic pistols
Semi-automatic pistols of the United States